Sonpur Assembly constituency, often spelt Sonepur, is in Saran district in the Indian state of Bihar.

Ram Sundar Das, sitting MLA from Sonpur 1977–1980, served as Bihar's Chief Minister briefly in 1979.

Overview
As per Delimitation of Parliamentary and Assembly constituencies Order, 2008, No. 122 Sonpur Assembly constituency is composed of the following: Sonpur and Dighwara C.D. blocks.

Sonpur Assembly constituency  is part of No. 20 Saran (Lok Sabha constituency). It was earlier part of Chapra (Lok Sabha constituency).

Members of Vidhan Sabha

Election results

2020 

 Dr Ramanuj Prasad (RJD) : 73,247 votes 
 Vinay Kumar Singh (BJP) : 66,561

2015 
 Dr Ramanuj Prasad (RJD) : 86,082 votes 
 Vinay Kumar Singh (BJP) : 49686

1980 Vidhan Sabha
 Lalu Prasad Yadav (Janata-Secular) : 45,041 votes  
 Jawahar Prasad Singh (Indira Congress) : 35,874
 Ram Sunder Das (Janata Party) : 10396

1977 Vidhan Sabha
 Ram Sunder Das (JNP) : 40,747 votes  
 Rameshwar Prasad Rai (IND) : 15,411

References

External links
 

Assembly constituencies of Bihar
Politics of Saran district